High Street is the main street running through the City of Fremantle, Western Australia. The street passes by historic landmarks, including the Round House, the Fremantle Town Hall, and the Fremantle War Memorial, through the Fremantle West End Heritage area and through two town squares. Trams operated along High Street for 47 years, between 1905 and 1952. Running east–west, High Street continues as Leach Highway, a major arterial road, at 
Stirling Highway, linking Fremantle with Perth Airport although the stretch of road between Stirling Highway and Carrington Street is known locally—and signed—as High Street.

History
Within twelve years of Fremantle being settled in 1829, High Street was considered the main road of the area. The street was named by the Surveyor-General of Western Australia John Septimus Roe, in line with the traditional naming of main streets in England. The east–west route linked the Round House at Arthur Head to Saint John's Church of England in Kings Square.
High Street was first paved in 1858 with Yorkshire flagstones; however, initially only the northern side of the road was paved. In 1881, the extension of High Street commenced after Saint John's Church sold land for the Fremantle Town Hall, and a right of way through Kings Square, to the Fremantle City Council.

In the 1960s, High Street was closed to traffic and made into a pedestrian mall between Queen Street and Market Street. This was carried out as part of a traffic management plan for Fremantle, which reinstated Kings Square as a town square, and turned the streets around the square into a one way rotary.

Trams

A plan for an electric tram network in Fremantle was submitted to the City Council in July 1897, that included routes along High Street. However, there was some opposition to the plans from local residents. The details of the tramway scheme were not finalised until June 1904. The Fremantle and East Fremantle councils financed the project through a loan of 80,000 pounds. The first trial runs of trams along High Street were on 30 September 1905, with the system officially opening on 30 October of that year. Trams operated along High Street until 1952, when the trams in Fremantle were replaced by buses. The trams were taken out of service due to their economic costs and to relieve traffic congestion on roads. The last tram service operated was on 8 November 1952.

High Street upgrade
The section of High Street between Carrington Street and Stirling Highway was upgraded between 2019 and 2022 to a dual carriageway expressway with a roundabout replacing the T junction with the latter road. The route is part of the main freight access for vehicles accessing the Port of Fremantle, and is a very busy intersection for trucks.

Route description

The street begins at the intersection of Leach Highway and Carrington Street, at Fremantle's eastern edge. It travels west as the continuation of State Route 7, meeting Stirling Highway after , at the highway's southern terminus. This stretch of road between Carrington Street and Stirling Highway is a part of Leach Highway. The road continues west for another , until it reaches Monument Hill at its intersection with East Street and Swanbourne Street. From there it turns south-west, reaching Ord Street after , which is the western terminus of State Route 7. High Street continues south-west, passing, after , through Queens Square, a set of four squares around High Street's intersection with Parry Street. Another  along is Queen Street, the north-eastern edge of Kings Square. The road's terminus is only  further along, at Little High Street, adjacent to the Round House.

Historic streetscape

High Street is lined by a significant number of heritage buildings between the Round House and where it becomes a pedestrian mall, at Market Street just west of the Fremantle Town Hall. The buildings include:

 1 High Street – Fremantle Municipal Tramways Car Barn
 4 High Street – Union Bank
 6 High Street – Hotel Fremantle
 7 High Street – Bank of New South Wales
 9 – 23 High Street – Owston's Buildings
 22 High Street – Westpac Building
 25 High Street – P&O Hotel
 28–36 High Street – Adelec Buildings
 35 High Street – Athena Lodge
 38–50 High Street – Marich Buildings
 39 High Street – Orient Hotel
 41–47 High Street – Union Stores Building
 61–63 High Street – Central Chambers
 80 High Street – Commercial Hotel
 81–83 High Street – R.S.L. Club
 84 High Street – ANZ Bank Building
 98 High Street – National Hotel
 101 High Street – Higham's Buildings

At the town hall the pedestrian mall is crossed by the intersection of Adelaide and William streets it then continues through Kings Square until it reaches Queen Street. The section of road through Kings Square is frequently used for festivals and markets. From Queens Street, High Street continues east until it abuts Leach Highway at Carrington street. Along this section of the road there are a number of further significant places including:

 160 High Street – Dalkeith House
 177 High Street – Oriana Cinema
 179 High Street – Victoria Hall
 186 High Street – Lenaville
 200 High Street – Fremantle Grammar School
 High & Swanborne – Fremantle War Memorial
 High & Carrington – Fremantle Cemetery

Major intersections

  Leach Highway (State Route 7) east / Carrington Street
  Stirling Highway (State Route 5) north
 East Street north / Swanbourne Street south
  Ord Street (State Route 12)
 Parry Street
 Queen Street
 Adelaide Street north-east / William Street south-east
 Market Street
 Cliff Street
 Little High Street

See also

Notes

Route description
 

 
Fremantle West End Heritage area
Streets in Fremantle
Articles containing video clips